Lars Elof Gustaf Brink (born 12 November 1943 - died 29 October 2022) was a Swedish theoretical physicist.

He made significant and well-cited contributions in supersymmetry, supergravity, superspace, and superstrings., and the connections among them. In 1977, with John Schwarz and Joël Scherk, he introduced  the first supersymmetric Yang-Mills theories.

During 1971–1973, he was member of the theory group at CERN.

Starting in 1986, he had been  professor of theoretical physics at Chalmers Institute of Technology in Gothenburg. Brink is one of the pioneers of superstring theory, since the 1970s (at CERN and Caltech). He coordinated the EU network Superstring Theory 1991–1995 and 2000–2008.

In 1997 he became a member of the Royal Swedish Academy of Sciences.

In 2001, 2004 and from 2008 to 2013 he was a member of the Nobel Committee for Physics and its chairman in 2013.

References

External links 

 Oral history interview transcript for Lars Brink on 27 May 2021, American Institute of Physics, Niels Bohr Library & Archives
      Author profile in Google Scholar
   ORCID

 

21st-century  Swedish physicists
20th-century Swedish physicists
1943 births
Members of the Royal Swedish Academy of Sciences
Academic staff of the Chalmers University of Technology
People associated with CERN